GameTek was an American video game publisher based in North Miami Beach, Florida known for publishing video game adaptations of game shows in the late 1980s and early 1990s. GameTek was a trade name for IJE, the owner of electronic publishing rights to Jeopardy! and Wheel of Fortune. Originally IJE licensed these titles to ShareData of Chandler, Arizona; however, when IJE saw ShareData's success with the titles, IJE decided to publish the titles themselves, resulting in the founding of GameTek.

After establishing distribution for the game show titles, GameTek branched out by licensing European titles for the North American market, including Frontier: Elite II and The Humans. In 1991, they attempted to launch the InfoGenius Systems franchise for the Game Boy.

In 1996 GameTek scaled down its publishing activities, turning most of that aspect of its business over to Philips. GameTek filed for bankruptcy in December 1997, citing development delays and disappointing sales, and went out of business in July 1998. Most of the company's assets were acquired by Take-Two Interactive in 1997.

Games

Wheel of Fortune
Wheel of Fortune arcade game (1989, Developed by Incredible Technologies)
Double Dare
Hollywood Squares
Jeopardy!
Jeopardy! Sports Edition
Press Your Luck
Quarantine
Quarantine II: Road Warrior
Family Feud
American Gladiators (Developed by Incredible Technologies)
Frontier: Elite II
Alien Incident (European Version)
 Cyberbykes: Shadow Racer VR
The Humans
Brutal: Paws of Fury
Brutal Unleashed: Above the Claw
Star Crusader (European version)
Valkyrie (for Macintosh)
Nomad
Robotech: Crystal Dreams (Cancelled)
Super Password
Super Street Fighter II Turbo (MS-DOS Version)
Frontier: First Encounters
Frantic Flea
NET:Zone
Daemon's Gate: Volume One, Dorovan's KeyTarzan: Lord of the JungleClassic ConcentrationThe Price Is RightNigel Mansell's World Championship RacingNow You See ItRace DaysYogi Bear's Gold Rush (Cancelled for Game Gear)Full Throttle: All-American RacingZool (Console & Handheld Versions)Micro Machines 2: Turbo Tournament (MS-DOS Version)Pinball Dreams (SNES, Game Boy and Game Gear Versions)Pinball Fantasies (SNES and Game Boy Versions)Pinball Mania'' (Game Boy Version Exclusive to Europe)

References

See also
Cybersoft (video game company) (GameTek subsidiary)

1987 establishments in Florida
1998 disestablishments in Florida
Video game publishers
Video game companies established in 1987
Video game companies disestablished in 1998
Defunct video game companies of the United States
Companies that filed for Chapter 11 bankruptcy in 1997
Defunct companies based in Florida